WJUC (107.3 FM "The Juice") is a commercial urban adult contemporary radio station in Swanton, Ohio, broadcasting to the Swanton, Ohio-Toledo, Ohio area.  The station's studios are located in Toledo, and its transmitter is located north of Swanton. WJUC is the Toledo area affiliate of The Chubb Rock Show, Tisha Lee in the Midday, The Jeff Foxx Show, and Love and R&B With Al B. Sure!.

WJUC, which began broadcasting in 1997, was the first African-American owned-and-operated radio station in the Toledo market and is one of the few radio stations in the area that is still locally owned and operated.  "The Juice" began as a station playing a wide variety of musical styles appealing to African-American listeners, including rap, soul oldies, gospel music, and blues.  Today, the station's playlist consists almost exclusively of R&B and urban contemporary hits, aside from a Sunday-morning gospel music program. Connecting to Community and Hometown Live are part of the Saturday Morning Juice, a community engagement show that consists of interviews and community topics.

WJUC is the brainchild of Charles "Charlie Chuck" Welch, a former disc jockey at the now-defunct WKLR-FM (now WKKO).

WJUC primarily competes with Urban Radio Broadcasting's WIMX-FM (Mix 95.7) for the ears of Urban AC listeners in Toledo.  The Juice's ratings have fallen in recent years due to competition, which is now usually the higher-rated (12+) of the two stations.  WJUC also suffers from a signal that becomes scratchy in the eastern portion of the Toledo metro area and under certain weather conditions is sometimes swamped by co-channel interference from WNWV-FM in Elyria, Ohio, although the station continues to enjoy respectable ratings despite its limited reach. This is due to the station’s reputation as the “hometown” station that engages the community.

The most recent endeavor of WJUC is a partnership with aMAYSing Kids Broadcasting and Media Mentorship Program, a 501(c)3 reading literacy program created by longtime WJUC radio personality Tisha Lee-Mays and husband Dante Mays. The program works to improve reading through teaching broadcasting fundamentals.

Effective May 25, 2017, Welch Communications assigned the license for WJUC to Fleming Street Communications, Inc., a corporation controlled by Charles Welch's children. Welch’s daughter, Debra Hogan serves as President of Fleming Street Communications.

External links
 

JUC
Urban adult contemporary radio stations in the United States
Radio stations established in 1997
1997 establishments in Ohio